Winifred Merrill may refer to:

 Winifred Edgerton Merrill (1862–1951), mathematician and astronomer, the first American woman to receive a PhD in mathematics
 Winifred Merrill Warren (1898–1990), American violinist and music educator